Cynthia Gibb (born December 14, 1963) is an American actress and former model who has starred in film and on television. She began her career as a cast member on the musical television drama Fame, based on the movie of the same name. She also appeared in the films Youngblood (1986), Salvador (1986), Malone (1987), Short Circuit 2 (1988) and Death Warrant (1990). She received a Golden Globe nomination for her performance as Gypsy Rose Lee in the film Gypsy (1993).

Life and career
Gibb grew up in Westport, Connecticut, and graduated from Staples High School. At the age of 14, she began assignments with the Ford Modeling Agency in New York City. She was on the cover of Vogue and Young Miss magazines. She was cast for her first film role, a small part as a Young Fan in Woody Allen's 1980 film Stardust Memories.

Gibb appeared in Youngblood starring Rob Lowe. She also played the role of Susan Martin Wyatt Carter on the soap opera Search for Tomorrow, appearing from 1981 to 1983. Gibb was a regular for three of the six seasons of the television series Fame, which aired from 1982 to 1987. She appeared in the Diagnosis: Murder movies in 1992 as Dr. Amanda Bentley. In Salvador (1986), directed by Oliver Stone and starring James Woods, she portrayed an American lay missionary in El Salvador who was brutally raped and murdered. In the TV adaptation of Gypsy, for which she was nominated for a Golden Globe Award for Best Supporting Actress – Series, Miniseries or Television Film; she played the adult Gypsy Rose Lee opposite Bette Midler as Madame Rose. Gibb later starred in the NBC sitcom Madman of the People  (1994–95), and UPN series Deadly Games (1995–97). She has also played in many TV movies, including the role of Karen Carpenter in The Karen Carpenter Story (1989). She played Mary Maloney opposite John Schneider in Mary Christmas.

Filmography

Awards and nominations

References

External links

 

Actresses from Vermont
American film actresses
American soap opera actresses
American stage actresses
American television actresses
Living people
People from Bennington, Vermont
20th-century American actresses
21st-century American actresses
Female models from Vermont
1963 births